Hydrozoanthidae is a family of cnidarians belonging to the order Zoantharia.

Genera:
 Aenigmanthus Kise, Maeda & Reimer, 2019 
 Hydrozoanthus Sinniger, Reimer & Pawlowski, 2010 
 Terrazoanthus Reimer & Fujii, 2010

References

 
Macrocnemina
Cnidarian families